Joseph Birch (6 July 1904 – 4 December 1980) was an English professional footballer who made more than 200 appearances in the Football League playing for Birmingham, Bournemouth & Boscombe Athletic and Fulham. He played as a full back.

Birch was born in Hednesford, Staffordshire. He played non-league football for Cannock Town and Hednesford Town before joining Birmingham in 1928. Birch played his only game for Birmingham in the First Division on Boxing Day 1928 in a 6–2 defeat at Bolton Wanderers, just before the club paid £4,000 for the services of Huddersfield Town full back Ned Barkas. He played for Bournemouth & Boscombe Athletic in the Third Division South before moving on to Fulham. In his first season Birch contributed to their winning the Third Division South title and consequent promotion, and in seven seasons with the club he played 185 league games. They awarded him a benefit match against fellow west London club Queens Park Rangers in 1937. He finished off his career with Colchester United, with whom he won the championship of the Southern League in the 1938–39 season.

Birch died in Colchester, Essex, in 1980 at the age of 76.

Honours
with Fulham
 Third Division South champions: 1931–32
with Colchester United
 Southern League champions: 1938–39

References

1904 births
1980 deaths
People from Hednesford
English footballers
Association football fullbacks
Hednesford Town F.C. players
Birmingham City F.C. players
AFC Bournemouth players
Fulham F.C. players
Colchester United F.C. players
English Football League players
Southern Football League players
Cannock Town F.C. players